Henry Trenchard (c. 1652 – 2 October 1694), of Lytchett Matravers, Dorset, was an English politician.

His brothers John Trenchard and Thomas Trenchard were also MPs.

He was a Member of Parliament (MP) for Poole in March 1679, October 1679, 1681 and 1689.

See also 

 Viscount Trenchard

References

1652 births
1694 deaths
Politicians from Dorset
English MPs 1679
English MPs 1681
English MPs 1689–1690